Maniyara is a 1983 Indian Malayalam film, Screenplay by moidu Padiyath directed by  M. Krishnan Nair and produced by T. E. Vasudevan. The film stars Mammootty, Seema, Adoor Bhasi and Shanthi Krishna in the lead roles. The film has musical score by A. T. Ummer.

Cast
Mammootty as Shameer
Seema as Noorjahan
Adoor Bhasi as Shameer's father
Shubha (actress) as Shameer's mother
Sathyakala as Ramla (Shameer's cousin)
Balan K. Nair as Noorjahan's father 
Shanthi Krishna as Ayyoob's wife
Shanavas as Ayyoob
Azeez  
Sankaradi as Sulaiman 
Mala Aravindan
Bahadoor

Plot
Noorjahan is married to Shameer, against Shameer's mother's will. This makes Noorjahan's life at his home difficult. Shameer's mother wanted to get Shameer married to her brother's daughter Sheela and makes use of Noorjahan's abortion to distance Shameer and Noorjahan. Shameer was convinced to marry Sheela stating that Noorjahan won't be able to conceive again. On Shameer's day of marriage to Sheela, Noorjahan loses consciousness and doctor finds out that she's pregnant.  This news is conveyed to Shameer and he comes to Noorjahan calling off the marriage. But he finds a lifeless Noorjahan and he realizes that it was his mother who manipulated the situation and he loses his sanity at the end

Soundtrack
The music was composed by A. T. Ummer and the lyrics were written by P. Bhaskaran.

References

External links
 

1983 films
1980s Malayalam-language films
Films directed by M. Krishnan Nair